National Route 156 is a national highway of Japan connecting Gifu and Takaoka, Toyama in Japan, with a total length of .

See also

References

156
Roads in Gifu Prefecture
Roads in Toyama Prefecture